2010–11 FIBA EuroChallenge was the eighth edition of Europe's third-tier level transnational men's professional club basketball FIBA EuroChallenge Tournament, organized by FIBA Europe. 
The Final Four was awarded to Oostende and was held from April 29 to May 1, 2011.

Teams
The labels in the parentheses show how each team qualified for the place of its starting round. 
 1st, 2nd, 3rd, 4th, 5th, etc.: League position after eventual Playoffs

Qualifying round

|-
|align=right| Nizhny Novgorod  || 177–174 || align=left|  Enisey || 92–92 || 85–82
|-
|align=right| Szolnoki Olaj  || 142–108 || align=left| Keravnos || 75–52 || 67–56
|-
|align=right| Paris-Levallois  || 141–152 || align=left|  Maccabi Haifa ||75–63 || 66–89
|-
|align=right| ZZ Leiden  || 128–164 || align=left|  Pınar Karşıyaka || 65–87 || 63–77
|-
|align=right| ETHA Encomi  || 135–130 || align=left|  Artland Dragons || 69–61 || 66–69
|-
|align=right| Bosna Asa   || 132–167 || align=left|  SLUC Nancy || 74–91 || 58–76
|-
|align=right| Lugano  ||166–157 || align=left|  Triumph Lyubertsy || 85–91 || 81–66
|-
|align=right| Norrköping Dolphins  || 171–163 || align=left|  Okapi Aalstar || 85–84 || 86–79
|-
|align=right| Khimik  || 176–174 || align=left|  CSU Asesoft Ploieşti || 90–83 || 86–91
|-
|align=right| Steaua Turabo   || 156–125 || align=left|  Kyiv || 77–59 || 79–66
|-
|align=right| Minsk-2006  || 167–176 || align=left|  Antwerp Giants || 87–87 || 80–89
|-
|align=right| Helios Domžale  || 131–154 || align=left|  Prostějov || 62–70 || 69–84
|-
|align=right| Dexia Mons-Hainaut  || 147–126 || align=left|  Trefl Sopot || 74–71 || 73–55
|-
|align=right| Benfica  || 182–177 || align=left|  Ferro-ZNTU || 105–105 || 77–72
|}

Regular season

The Regular Season began on November 16, 2010.

Group A

Group B

Group C

Group D

Group E

Group F

Group G

Group H

Last 16

Starts on January 18, 2011

Group I

Group J

Group K

Group L

Quarter Final Round
Started on March 22, 2011.

Best of 3 games

Final four

References
General

Season page at FIBA Europe.com

External links
 FIBA Europe
 European Basketball Website

2010
Euro